Karate is an Asian Games event first held at the 1994 in Hiroshima, Japan.

Editions

Events

Medal table

List of medalists

References

Medallists from previous Asian Games - Karate

External links
Asian Karate Federation

 
Sports at the Asian Games
Asian Games
Karate in Asia